Dream Wife is the debut studio album by the British punk rock band Dream Wife, released via Lucky Number in January 2018.

Release
On 28 October 2016, the band released the first single from the album, "F.U.U." The music video to the single was released on 8 March 2018, and features Fever Dream and directed by Aidan Zamiri.

On 31 January 2017, Dream Wife explained they were halfway to completing their debut album, while recording it at a studio in Notting Hill.

The second single "Somebody" was announced on 8 March 2017. The band described the single as "a conversation on the reclamation of bodies by the women who occupy them in a tender, yet direct, and empowering way". The music video to the single was released on 29 March 2017, and was directed by John Podpadec and filmed in Wedmore.

On 15 August 2017, the third single "Fire" was announced. The music video for the single was released on 6 September 2017. The single was made into an EP on 27 September 2017, which got rave reviews from critics.

On 25 October 2017, Dream Wife announced the release of their new album, along with the fourth single "Let's Make Out".

Critical reception

Upon its release, Dream Wife received "generally favorable reviews" according to Metacritic who gave the album a score of 77/100 based on 16 reviews from critics. Aggregator Album of the Year gave the release an 81 out of 100 based on a critical consensus of 22 reviews.

Accolades

Track listing

Personnel
Credits adapted from Discogs
 Rakel Mjöll Leifsdóttir – lead vocals
 Alice Gough – guitar, vocals
 Isabella Podpadec – bass, vocals
 Alex Paveley – drums (tracks 1–4 and 6–11)
 Paeris Giles – drums (track 5)
 Fever Dream – co-lead vocals (track 11)
 Oliver Wright – production, mixing
 Peter Jarrett – production, mixing
 Steven Ansell – additional drum recording (track 5)
 Ione Gamble – artwork
 Cady Siregar – artwork assistant
 Tim Hampson – artwork assistant
 Hollie Fernando – photography
 Elizabeth Gabrielle Lee – photography
 Jender Anomie – photography

References

2018 debut albums
Dream Wife (band) albums